Zwentendorf an der Donau is a small market municipality in the Austrian state of Lower Austria. The place attained public attention as the site of the only Austrian nuclear power station, which was completed but never went into operation. In a referendum on 5 November 1978, a narrow majority of 50.5% voted against putting the Zwentendorf nuclear plant into operation.

Population

History
It was a part from Limes Norici of the Roman province Noricum.

See also
Anti-nuclear movement in Austria
Freda Meissner-Blau
Hildegard Breiner
Zwentendorf Nuclear Power Plant

References

External links

 Google Maps: HVDC-back-to-back station

Cities and towns in Tulln District
Populated places on the Danube
Cadastral community of Tulln District
Anti–nuclear power movement
Nuclear power in Austria